The M49 submachine gun is a Yugoslavian submachine gun chambered in 7.62×25mm Tokarev, designed for use with the Yugoslav People's Army.  While externally similar to the PPSh-41, as well as being able to interchange magazines, the M49 is actually  very different in both construction and design.  More similar in nature to the Italian Beretta Model 38, the M49 features a one-piece tube receiver which contains the bolt, recoil spring and buffer mechanism.  Constructed of machined parts as well as simple tubing, the receiver assembly incorporates a ventilated barrel shroud to protect the operator from being burned during periods of rapid-fire, as well as a simple muzzle brake to steady the weapon.

The M49 is a select fire weapon, with the selector switch being located immediately in front of the trigger, within the trigger guard.  The safety is of a push-button variety, which is located on the side of the stock forward of the trigger group.  Unlike the later M56 Submachine gun, the M49 features a solid wood stock, similar in construction to that of the M48 Mauser rifle also in use at the time.  The M49 is disassembled by unscrewing the cap on the rear of the receiver, permitting all of the internal parts to be extracted through the opening.  The M49 and the later M49/57 variant are different only in minor details.

Users

See also
PPSh-41
Beretta Model 38
Suomi KP/-31
M56 Submachine gun

References

External links
 Zastava Arms official website

7.62×25mm Tokarev submachine guns
Infantry weapons of the Cold War
Simple blowback firearms
Submachine guns of Yugoslavia
Weapons and ammunition introduced in 1949